Rémi Delatte (born 9 June 1956 in Dijon) is a French politician of the Republicans who currently serves as a member of the National Assembly of France, representing the Côte-d'Or department.

In the Republicans’ 2016 presidential primaries, Delatte endorsed François Fillon as the party's candidate for the office of President of France.

On 4 May 2022 he announced that he would be standing down at the 2022 French legislative election.

References

1956 births
Living people
Politicians from Dijon
Rally for the Republic politicians
Union for a Popular Movement politicians
The Republicans (France) politicians
The Social Right
Deputies of the 15th National Assembly of the French Fifth Republic
Deputies of the 13th National Assembly of the French Fifth Republic
Deputies of the 14th National Assembly of the French Fifth Republic